Partoun  is an unincorporated community in Juab County, Utah, United States. It is located in Snake Valley at latitude 39.64661N and longitude -113.88700W with an elevation of 4,818' (1,469m).  It was founded in 1949 by the religious group called the Aaronic Order, and named after a town in Scotland.

Partoun is part of the Provo–Orem, Utah Metropolitan Statistical Area.

Partoun is also home to both the West Desert High School and the West Desert Elementary School, even though the website mentions the neighboring community of Trout Creek to the north.

Climate

References

External links

Unincorporated communities in Juab County, Utah
Unincorporated communities in Utah
Provo–Orem metropolitan area
Populated places established in 1949